Beatrice I may refer to:

Beatrice I, Abbess of Quedlinburg (1037–1061)
Beatrice I, Countess of Burgundy (1143–1184)